Old Europe or Old European may refer to:

 Old Europe (archaeology) (6500-2800 BC), a culture of Neolithic Europe
 Old European languages, the mostly unknown languages that were spoken in Europe prior to the spread of the Indo-European and Uralic families
 Old European script, Vinča symbols
 Old European hydronymy (ca. 2500-1500 BC), in Central and Western Europe
 Old Europe, a term for pre-modern (i.e. pre-1800) European history coined by Austrian historian Otto Brunner
 "Old Europe" (politics), used by former U.S. Secretary of Defense Donald Rumsfeld
 Old Europe, New Europe, Core Europe, a book

See also
 Ancient Europe (disambiguation)
 History of Europe
 New Europe (disambiguation)

eu:Aurre-indoeuropar herriak
it:Europa Antica
pl:Kultura starej Europy
pt:Civilização da Europa Antiga
ru:Старая Европа